is a Japanese voice actress from Ehime Prefecture. She is affiliated with Mausu Promotion. Her major roles are Kozue Orihara in Chaos;Head, Rose in Red Garden, Elise in Sky Girls, and Bara-tan (Baratack) in Robot Girls Z.

Filmography

Anime

Video games

Drama CD

References

External links 
 

Japanese voice actresses
Living people
Voice actresses from Ehime Prefecture
Japanese video game actresses
Mausu Promotion voice actors
Year of birth missing (living people)